Roma Maffia (born May 31, 1958) is an American actress.

Life and career
Roma Maffia grew up in Brooklyn, New York and is of mixed English, German and West Indian descent. Her Italian surname reportedly comes from her stepfather.

Maffia began her official acting career in off-Broadway and off-off-Broadway productions. In 1994, she played Carmen in director Ron Howard's film The Paper. Soon after, she landed a role on the television series Chicago Hope. Maffia's television career continued as she played Grace Alvarez, the forensic pathologist for the Violent Crimes Task Force for four seasons on Profiler. She has had guest-starring and recurring roles on shows such as ER, The West Wing, and Law & Order.

Her most widely seen performances may be playing Seattle attorney Catherine Alvarez in the 1994 film Disclosure, starring Michael Douglas and Demi Moore. She followed this with a series of performances as Vanessa Galiano in the TV series Law & Order and as Judge Victoria Peyton on Boston Legal.

From 2003 until 2010, Maffia appeared as Liz Cruz on the FX Network series Nip/Tuck, the anesthesiologist colleague of two dysfunctional plastic surgeons. Maffia and Julian McMahon also worked together on the TV show Profiler. Maffia is a 1973 graduate of St. Michael Academy. Maffia had a supporting role on Pretty Little Liars from seasons 4 to 7. Her character, Linda Tanner is a savvy, no-nonsense state investigator working on unsolved murder cases in the fictional town of Rosewood, Pennsylvania.

In 2012, Roma appeared in several episodes of Grey’s Anatomy.

She appeared in Season 4 of In the Dark as Paula Romano, a drug dealer who deals a drug called "Bolt" both in and out of prison.

Filmography

Film

Television

Notes

References

External links

Interview with Roma Maffia

1958 births
20th-century American actresses
21st-century American actresses
Actresses from New York City
American film actresses
African-American actresses
American people of English descent
American people of German descent
American people of West Indian descent
American television actresses
Living people
People from Brooklyn